Saad Kameel Al-Fadhli (born January 6, 1963) is a former Kuwaiti football referee, best known for supervising three matches at the 2002 FIFA World Cup held in Japan and South Korea.

He was in charge of the FIFA Youth World Cup final in 1997 in Malaysia.

References
 Profile

1963 births
Living people
Kuwaiti football referees
FIFA World Cup referees
2002 FIFA World Cup referees
Olympic football referees
AFC Asian Cup referees